The Jehangir Nicholson Art Foundation (JNAF) is a private, not-for-profit organization located in Mumbai, Indian with its core interest in promoting the preservation, exhibition, education, and research of post-colonial Indian modern art. The collection is endowed by the personal collection of the late Jehangir Nicholson, comprising over 800 pieces of art across mediums from artists including M. F. Husain, Vasudeo S. Gaitonde, S. H. Raza, K. H. Ara, etc. The foundation is currently housed in the Chhatrapati Shivaji Maharaj Vastu Sangrahalaya, managing the Jehangir Nicholson Gallery - the modern and contemporary art wing of the museum.

History 

Jehangir Nicholson (1915 - 2001) was a chartered accountant and the last heir of a cotton gin and press, Breul and Co. (estb.1863), Nicholson recounted his early introduction to the art world in December 1968 when he purchased a landscape by Sharad Waykool, who was exhibiting in the Taj Art Gallery. Since then, Nicolson had become an active patron for the major galleries in Mumbai, Chemound and Pundole, not only building his personal collection to sizable and museum-quality but also forming personal friendships with some of the artists himself, especially with the members of the Bombay Progressive Artists' Group. 

As Nicholson's collection grew throughout the 60s, he had always had in mind the vision of sharing his pieces with the public through building a museum dedicated to contemporary art. In 1976, he loaned some of his collections to the National Centre for the Performing Arts (India) (NCPA) to establish the Jehangir Nicholson Museum of Modern Art with the help of V. K. Narayana Menon, the chairman of NCPA, J. R. D. Tata, and Bal Chhabda. This is one of the first public-facing museums of post-colonial art in Mumbai. In addition to that, Nicolson further organized two public exhibitions at the National Gallery of Modern Art, in Mumbai in 1998 and in Delhi in 1999, where he exhibited more than 250 works from his private collection. 

With the sheer number of works he collected, the spaces of the galleries at NGMA were simply not enough. Therefore, Nicholson furthered his quest to build a museum of contemporary art that could accommodate his growing collection by actively negotiating with the government for land to establish a free-standing museum - an effort he continued until his death in 2001 and included in his will. The Jehangir Nicholson Museum at NCPA closed down shortly after in the same year.
 
Nicholson's godson Cyrus Guzder and lawyer Kaiwan Kalyaniwalla established the Jehangir Nicholson Art Foundation based on his will, aiming to preserve, document, and update one of the richest private collections that reflects the complexities, vitality, and crucial phases of development in modern Indian art history. In 2008, the foundation entered a partnership with the CSMVS to set up the Jehangir Nicholson Gallery (open in 2011) as the modern and contemporary art wing at the East Annex. The foundation also houses its office, a library, and a research center, as well as a visible storage archive for the JNAF Collection in the CSMVS. The Jehangir Nicholson Gallery celebrated its 10th year of opening in 2021.

The Collection 
The Jehangir Nicholson Collection has great historical interest and importance because it often covers a wide range of works chronologically for each of the artists, adding understanding to the dimension and scope of representations. It comprises over 800 works of modern and contemporary Indian art procured from 1968 to 2001 by Nicholson. The core strength of the collection lies in its comprehensiveness of the works by the Bombay Progressive Artists and their contemporaries, including S. H. Raza, K. H. Ara, Gaitonde, Tyeb Mehta, M. F. Husain, Akbar Padamsee, Ram Kumar, Krishen Khana, F. N. Souza, and Laxman Shrestha.

The collection also includes a vast number of strong works from artists that are often associated with the Baroda Group, including K. G. Subramanyan, N. S. Bendre, Bhupen Khakhar, Gulam Mohanmmed Sheikh, Rekha Rodwittiya, Vivam Sundaram, and Nilima Sheikh. Other artists that are represented include Homi Patel, Ganesh Haloi, Prabhakar Kolte, Prabhakar Barwe, Jogen Chowdhury, Bakash Bhattacharjee, Bhupen Khakar, C. Douglas, Surendran Nair, Nalini Malani, and Arpana Caur.

Aside from two-dimensional pieces, the collection also contains works from sculptors such as Pilloo Pochkhanawala, Adi Davierwala, Sankho Choudhary, Ramesh Pateria, Nagji Patel, and B. Vithal.

Exhibitions 

 F N Souza: The Power and the Glory (30 October 2021 - 3 January 2022)
 Akbar Padamsee: A Tribute (2020)
V. S. Gaitonde: The Silent Observer (2019) 
Foy Nissen's Bombay: Photographs from the archive of Foy Nissen (2019)
Still/Life: Dutch Contemporary Photography (In collaboration with Foam Fotografiemuseum, Amsterdam) 
Jayashree Chakravarty: Earth as Haven: under the canopy of love (2018)
Songs from the Blood of the Weary (Dialogues of Peace): Rekha Rodwittiya (Apr-Aug 2018)
Gedney in India (In collaboration with Duke University Libraries) (Mar-Jun 2017) 
Kanu's Gandhi (In collaboration with Nazar Foundation) 
Laxman Shreshtha: The Infinite Project (Aug- Dec 2016) 
The Journey is the Destination: The Artist's Journey between Then and Now (2016)
Voicing a Presence:Women Artists from the Jehangir Nicholson Collection (2012–13)
 Nothing is Absolute: A Journey Through Abstraction (2013)
 Kekoo, Kali & Jehangir: Framing A Collection (2014)
 Portraits of a Collector: Photographs by Jehangir Nicholson

Publications
 V. S Gaitonde, The Silent Observer 
 Foy Nissen's Bombay: Photographs from the Archives of Foy Nissen
 Ram Kumar: Works in the Jehangir Nicholson Collection 
 Voicing a Presence
 The Journey is the Destination: The Artist's Journey between Then and Now
 Laxman Shreshtha: The Infinite Project
 Songs from the Blood of the Weary (Dialogues of Peace): Rekha Rodwittiya 
 Nothing is Absolute: A Journey through Abstraction 
 Keboo, Kali & Jehangir: Framing a Collection 
 Jitish Kallat: Covering Letter

References

External links 
 JNAF Website

Culture of Mumbai
Arts organisations based in India
Art museums and galleries in India
Art museums and galleries in Mumbai
Contemporary art galleries in India